Hacienda (also Cosmo) is a community in Sonoma County, California. It is located west of Santa Rosa on the Russian River. First settled in 1871, it was served by the Northwest Pacific Railroad from 1876 to 1935. Hacienda was a popular river resort from the 1920s through the 1950s with a nine-hole golf course and beach.

References

Populated places in Sonoma County, California
1871 establishments in California